Bayleyite is a uranium carbonate mineral with the chemical formula: Mg2(UO2)(CO3)3·18(H2O).  It is a secondary mineral which contains magnesium, uranium and carbon. It is a bright yellow color. Its crystal habit is acicular but is more commonly found as crusts on uranium bearing ores. It has a Mohs hardness of about 2-2.5.

Occurrence
It was first described in 1948 for an occurrence in the Hillside mine, north of Bagdad, Yavapai County, Arizona and named for mineralogist William Shirley Bayley (1861–1943) of the University of Illinois. It occurs as an efflorescence or coating on other secondary minerals and often is deposited on mine walls and workings. It occurs with schrockingerite, andersonite, swartzite and gypsum in the Hillside mine; with schrockingerite and gypsum in the Hideout mine in Utah; and with tyuyamunite, uranophane, liebigite and carnotite in the Powder River Basin in Wyoming.

References

Uranium(VI) minerals
Carbonate minerals
Monoclinic minerals
Minerals in space group 14
Minerals described in 1948